The Cullars Rotation is a soil fertility experiment on the Auburn University campus in Auburn, Alabama and is listed on the National Register of Historic Places.  The Cullars Rotation experiment, which started in 1911, is the oldest ongoing cotton fertility experiment in the United States, the oldest soil fertility experiment in the Southern United States, and the second oldest continuous cotton experiment in the world.

History

In the late 19th century, the land on which the Cullars Rotation sits was used in a number of agricultural experiments, including one that established the disease cotton rust was caused by a deficiency of potassium.  In 1911, the Alabama Legislature set aside money for an experiment to study the long-term effects of fertilization on a three-year rotation of cotton, corn, and wheat and soybeans.  The Cullars site was chosen for this study and the experiment has continued unabated since.  In 1938, the site was purchased by the Alabama Polytechnic Institute, which administered the study.  In 2001, the portion of the Cullars site not occupied by the Cullars Rotation was landscaped as the grounds of the Jule Collins Smith Museum of Fine Art; however, a 40-foot buffer is maintained between the museum grounds and the rotation to ensure experimental integrity.

Experiment

The Cullars Rotation consists of three sets of 14 soil treatments, with one set of treatments for each of the three crops (cotton, corn, and wheat and soybeans) in the rotation.  Each treatment fills a roughly 2000 square foot (184 m²) plot, with a two-foot (60 cm) buffer between plots.  The 14 soil treatments are:

 Legumes planted, but no nitrogen fertilizer
 No legumes or nitrogen fertilizer
 Nothing added to soil
 Nitrogen fertilizer added, but no winter legumes
 No phosphorus added
 No micronutrients added
 Excess potassium added
 Rock phosphate added
 No potassium added
 Two-thirds of regular amount of potassium added
 No lime added
 No sulfur added
 Complete fertilization with micronutrients
 One-third of regular amount of potassium added

Continuous farming of the plots which have not been given treatments have made certain sections of the Cullars Rotation some of the most nutrient poor soil in the United States.

Miscellaneous

The Cullars Rotation is located east of the grounds of the Jule Collins Smith Museum of Fine Art at the corner of College Street and Woodfield Drive in Auburn.  As an ongoing experiment, the Rotation is not open to the public, but can be viewed from the museum grounds.  The Rotation was placed on the National Register of Historic Places on May 18, 2003.

See also
Old Rotation - A similar nearby agricultural rotation experiment
National Register of Historic Places listings in Lee County, Alabama

References

Mitchell, C.C., Delaney, D.P., Balkcom, K.S. 2004. Alabama's "Cullars Rotation" Experiment (C. 1911) On National Register Of Historical Places [abstract]. American Society Of Agronomy Meetings.

Auburn, Alabama
National Register of Historic Places in Lee County, Alabama
Auburn University
Farms on the National Register of Historic Places in Alabama
Cotton industry in the United States